Total Brutal is the debut full-length album by Austrian Death Machine, a project of As I Lay Dying's vocalist Tim Lambesis. The band and record are based upon Arnold Schwarzenegger and his movies. Tim plays all of the instruments (apart from guest solo guitar work) and performs vocals but "Ahhhnold" is billed as the vocalist. Destroy the Runner vocalist Chad Ackerman voices all of the Schwarzenegger impersonations. The album was released on July 22, 2008. On the cover of the original release of the album "Machine" was spelled with two 'i's, while new pressings of the album have the spelling corrected.

Track list

Personnel
Austrian Death Machine
Tim Lambesis (of As I Lay Dying) – vocals, guitar, bass, drums, trumpet, keyboards
Chad Ackerman (of Destroy the Runner) – Schwarzenegger impersonation vocals

Guest musicians
Jason Suecof (of Capharnaum) – tracks 2 & 13
Mark MacDonald (of Mercury Switch) – tracks 3, 9, & 16
Dan Fitzgerald – track 5
Adam Dutkiewicz (of Killswitch Engage) – track 6
Nick Hipa (of As I Lay Dying) – track 8
Eyal Levi & Emil Werstler (of Dååth) – track 11
Jason Barnes (formerly of Haste the Day) – track 15
Sal Lococo (of Sworn Enemy) – guest vocals as The Predator on track 15
JP Gericke – additional guitars
Btown – fill in drums
Mike Catalano (of Destroy the Runner) – additional percussion on track 6
Jerad Buckwalter (of Sworn Enemy) – additional cymbals on track 6
Joey St. Lucas, Meggan Lambesis, Duane Reed (of Destroy the Runner) & Marc Kohlbry (formerly of Destroy the Runner) – group vocals on track 6
Josh Gilbert (of As I Lay Dying) – guest vocals on track 5

References

2008 debut albums
Austrian Death Machine albums
Metal Blade Records albums
Albums produced by Adam Dutkiewicz
Albums with cover art by Ed Repka